Indralohathil Na Azhagappan ( Na. Azhagappan in heaven) is a 2008 Indian Tamil-language fantasy comedy film directed by Thambi Ramaiah, who directs his second feature film after Manu Needhi. After the success of Vadivelu's debut film as the protagonist in Imsai Arasan 23m Pulikesi, Ramaiah signed him up for the project.  It is based on the film Rambaiyin Kaadhal (1956).

Apart from Vadivelu, the rest of the cast had been announced after the launch. Despite several indications that two prominent actress, would portray the lead female roles; a debutant, Yamini Sharma and Suja were selected. Nassar, Sumithra and the director himself, play supporting roles, while prominent heroine, Shriya Saran, was recruited to act as a ghost buster and dance in a single song. The film released on 1 February 2008 to largely negative reviews.

Plot
Azhagappan (Vadivelu) is a member of a theatre group. One fine day, an unlikely visitor from the heavens stumbles upon him and almost falls for him. The beautiful trio of the heaven – ramba (Yamini Sharma), Urvashi (Suja Varunee), and Menaka  – comes to the earth to enjoy its "beauty". While the others get back to where they belong to at the right time, Rambha loses her track and gets into trouble. Azhagappan accidentally helps her go back to heaven. She gets him to heaven during the night and sends him back to the earth early in the morning. Frequenting to the heaven and the hell gives Azhagappan an idea of what is happening in the other world. He is not serious about his rare opportunity to see Lord Indra (Vadivelu) (the king of all deities) and the deities, but the death of a neighboring child changes everything. He takes the thing seriously and wants to teach a lesson to the deity of death, Yama (Vadivelu). Vexed with the death and the ways that human beings are treated with in hell, Azhagappan decides to tamper with the process of life and death and the laws of the gods. The gods get angry, and Azhagappan pays the price. Comedy turns into tragedy, as he is transformed into a 90-year-old whom even his mother (Sumithra) cannot recognize, and Rambha is cursed to become a formless soul. Naradha (Nassar) makes amends to bring up the climax. Devendran seeks Brihaspathi's counsel and a way to relieve Azhagappan and Rambha from their curses is born. How this happens, even though Yama tries his best to stop it from happening, forms the rest of the climax.

Cast

Vadivelu as Indra/Yama/Na. Azhagappan
Yamini Sharma as Rambha
Suja Varunee as Urvashi
Nassar as Naradha
Thambi Ramaiah as Chitragupta
Sumithra as Azhagappan's mother
V. S. Raghavan
Manobala
Raj Kapoor
Singamuthu
Thyagu
O. A. K. Sundar
Benjamin
Shankar
King Kong
Bonda Mani
Halwa Vasu
Bava Lakshmanan
Shriya Saran as an item number (special appearance in the song "Mallika Sherawata? Marilyn Monroe va?")

Soundtrack
Soundtrack was composed by Sabesh–Murali with lyrics written by Kabilan, Pulamaipithan, and director Thambi Ramaiah.

Development
Indiralohathil Na Azhagappan  carried great expectations after success of Vadivelu's previous film, which was a blockbuster. Early reports indicated that Vadivelu was set to play 9 different roles, but soon after, Ramaiah, confirmed Vadivel will portray three roles as the characters of Gods: Indra, Yamaraja and the role of a normal man, Na. Azhagappan.

Initially Thambi Ramaiah preferred to have Prakash Raj in the role of Yeman but Vadivelu insisted and performed three roles.

Unlike the male lead's role, the female lead's role took longer to confirm. Prominent actresses Shilpa Shetty became heavily linked to the project, however, after joining the Celebrity Big Brother household, she refused the role. Simran Bagga, a leading actress in the early 2000s, attempting a comeback was also considered as well as Vadivelu's previous heroine Tejashree. Eventually the roles went to Yamini Sharma and Suja. Other members of the cast announced at the time were Nassar, Sumithra, the director himself Thambi Ramaiah and another prominent director, Raj Kapoor.

Furthermore, surprisingly Shriya Saran, a top actress in South India was recruited to play the role of a ghost buster named Pidiaratha in a cameo role as well as feature in a single song titled, Mallika Sherawata? Marilyn Monroea?, after the role rejected by Trisha where she said, "I am not ready to dance in a comedian film." Namitha also wanted herself to be the part, but the director felt that the role not suitable for her. Saran mentioned, "I am really grateful to work with legendary comedy actor like Vadivelu sir."

Release and reception
The movie released on 1 February 2008 and the hype around the movie slowly started as this was Vadivelu's second film in which he starred as the hero. After a few days, this film was declared a flop mainly.
But it remains a cult classic in Television.

References

External links
 

2008 films
2000s Tamil-language films
2000s fantasy comedy films
Indian fantasy comedy films
2008 comedy films